Rhizosoleniaceae is a family of diatoms belonging to the order Rhizosoleniales.

Genera:
 Calyptrella Castillo, 1996
 Dactyliosolen A.F.Castracane, 1886
 Guinardia H.Peragallo, 1892
 Henseniella F.Schütt ex G.B.De Toni, 1894
 Neocalyprella Hernàndez-Becerril
 Neocalyptrella Castillo, 1997
 Proboscia B.G.Sundstrom, 1986
 Pseudosolenia B.G.Sundstrom, 1986
 Rhizosolenia T.Brightwell, 1858
 Urosolenia F.E.Round & R.M.Crawford, 1990

References

Diatoms
Diatom families